Crambus magnificus is a moth in the family Crambidae. It was described by Stanisław Błeszyński in 1956. It is found in Sichuan, China.

References

Crambini
Moths described in 1956
Moths of Asia